Agonopterix subumbellana is a moth of the family Depressariidae. It is found in Armenia, Russia and Turkey.

References

Moths described in 1959
Agonopterix
Moths of Europe
Moths of Asia